Horninglow and Eton is a civil parish in the district of East Staffordshire, Staffordshire, England.  It contains six listed buildings that are recorded in the National Heritage List for England.  Of these, one is listed at Grade I, the highest of the three grades, and the others are at Grade II, the lowest grade.  The parish is to the northwest of Burton upon Trent and is mainly residential.  The most important listed building is St Chad's Church, and the war memorial in its churchyard is also listed.  Remainders of the parish's industrial past are a former hydraulic power house and a former railway warehouse.  The other listed buildings are a farmhouse and a milepost.


Key

Buildings

See also

Listed buildings in Burton (civil parish)

References

Citations

Sources

Lists of listed buildings in Staffordshire
 Horninglow